Arnaud Benjamin Boetsch (born 1 April 1969) is a French former tennis player who turned professional in 1987. Known for his stylish single-handed backhand, he won 3 career titles, reaching his highest ATP singles ranking of World No. 12 in April 1996.

Tennis career
Boetsch reached the fourth round once in each of the four grand slams between 1991 and 1996, notably beating Richard Krajicek in five sets in his 1992 Wimbledon run (Krajicek would go on to win the title four years later).

Boetsch represented France at the 1996 Summer Olympics in Atlanta, where he was defeated in the second round by Spain's eventual Silver medal winner Sergi Bruguera.

He currently works as a tennis commentator for France Télévisions with Lionel Chamoulaud or François Brabant.

ATP career finals

Singles: 10 (3 titles, 7 runner-ups)

Doubles: 5 (2 titles, 3 runners-up)

ATP Challenger and ITF Futures finals

Singles: 2 (0–2)

Doubles: 2 (0–2)

Performance timelines

Singles

Doubles

External links
 
 
 
 
 
 

1969 births
Living people
French male tennis players
French expatriate sportspeople in Switzerland
French sports broadcasters
Hopman Cup competitors
Olympic tennis players of France
People from Meulan-en-Yvelines
French people of German descent
Tennis commentators
Tennis players at the 1996 Summer Olympics
French male non-fiction writers
Sportspeople from Yvelines